The 168th Street station (formerly the Washington Heights–168th Street station) is an underground New York City Subway station complex shared by the IRT Broadway–Seventh Avenue Line and IND Eighth Avenue Line. It is located at the intersection of 168th Street and Broadway in Washington Heights, Manhattan and served by the 1 and A trains at all times, and the C train at all times except late nights.

The Broadway–Seventh Avenue Line station was built for the Interborough Rapid Transit Company (IRT), and was a station on the West Side Branch of the city's first subway line, which was approved in 1900. The station opened on April 14, 1906. The Eighth Avenue Line station was built as an express and terminal station for the Independent Subway System (IND) and opened on September 10, 1932, as part of the IND's first segment.

The IRT station has two side platforms and two tracks. The IND station has two island platforms and four tracks, although the track configuration is reversed from most New York City Subway express stations, with express trains using the outer tracks and local trains using the inner tracks. The transfer between the IRT platforms and the IND platforms has been within fare control since July 1, 1948. The IND station contains elevators, which make it compliant with the Americans with Disabilities Act of 1990 (ADA). While the IRT station can only be reached by elevators, it is not ADA-accessible. The IRT station's interior is listed on the National Register of Historic Places.

History 
The IRT Broadway–Seventh Avenue Line and IND Eighth Avenue Line stations are connected by a passageway, which was placed inside fare control on July 1, 1948.

IRT Broadway–Seventh Avenue Line

Construction and opening 
Planning for a subway line in New York City dates to 1864. However, development of what would become the city's first subway line did not start until 1894, when the New York State Legislature authorized the Rapid Transit Act. The subway plans were drawn up by a team of engineers led by William Barclay Parsons, chief engineer of the Rapid Transit Commission. It called for a subway line from New York City Hall in lower Manhattan to the Upper West Side, where two branches would lead north into the Bronx. A plan was formally adopted in 1897, and all legal conflicts concerning the route alignment were resolved near the end of 1899.

The Rapid Transit Construction Company, organized by John B. McDonald and funded by August Belmont Jr., signed the initial Contract 1 with the Rapid Transit Commission in February 1900, under which it would construct the subway and maintain a 50-year operating lease from the opening of the line. In 1901, the firm of Heins & LaFarge was hired to design the underground stations. Belmont incorporated the Interborough Rapid Transit Company (IRT) in April 1902 to operate the subway.

The 168th Street station was constructed as part of the IRT's West Side Line (now the Broadway–Seventh Avenue Line) from 133rd Street to a point 100 feet (30 m) north of 182nd Street. Work on this section was conducted by L. B. McCabe & Brother, who started building the tunnel segment on May 14, 1900.

The original New York City Subway line from City Hall to 145th Street on the West Side Branch opened in 1904, with the line being extended to 157th Street that year. The West Side Branch was extended northward from 157th Street to a temporary terminus at 221st Street, near the Harlem River Ship Canal, on March 12, 1906, with the station at 168th Street not yet open. This extension was initially served by shuttle trains operating between 157th Street and 221st Street. The 168th Street station opened for service on April 14, 1906. On May 30, 1906, express trains began running through to 221st Street. The opening of the first subway line, and particularly the 168th Street station, helped contribute to the development of Washington Heights.

20th century changes 
After the first subway line was completed in 1908, the station was served by West Side local and express trains. Express trains began at South Ferry in Manhattan or Atlantic Avenue in Brooklyn, and ended at 242nd Street in the Bronx. Local trains ran from City Hall to 242nd Street during rush hours, continuing south from City Hall to South Ferry at other times. In 1918, the Broadway–Seventh Avenue Line opened south of Times Square–42nd Street, thereby dividing the original line into an "H"-shaped system. The original subway north of Times Square thus became part of the Broadway–Seventh Avenue Line. Local trains were sent to South Ferry, while express trains used the new Clark Street Tunnel to Brooklyn.

In Fiscal Year 1909, work was done to increase the carrying load of the elevators at the station. To address overcrowding, in 1909, the New York Public Service Commission proposed lengthening platforms at stations along the original IRT subway. As part of a modification to the IRT's construction contracts, made on January 18, 1910, the company was to lengthen station platforms to accommodate ten-car express and six-car local trains. In addition to $1.5 million (equivalent to $ million in ) spent on platform lengthening, $500,000 was spent on building additional entrances and exits. It was anticipated that these improvements would increase capacity by 25 percent. The northbound platform at the 168th Street station was extended  to the south. The arched ceiling adjacent to the platform extension was replaced with a flat roof made of steel beams, since the arch's structural integrity was compromised by the platform extension. The southbound platform was not lengthened. Six-car local trains began operating in October 1910, and ten-car express trains began running on the West Side Line on January 24, 1911. Subsequently, the station could accommodate six-car local trains, but ten-car trains could not open some of their doors.

In Fiscal Year 1923, work began on the installation of a new entrance with elevators on the west side of Broadway to increase the capacity of the station. In Fiscal Year 1924, work to construct new entrances to the station was 87 percent complete, and two new elevators were installed.

The city government took over the IRT's operations on June 12, 1940. A contract for the platform extensions at 168th Street and eight other stations on the line was awarded to Spencer, White & Prentis Inc. in October 1946. The platform extensions at these stations were opened in stages. On April 6, 1948, the platform extension opened for stations from 103rd Street to Dyckman Street, including this station but excluding 125th Street. Simultaneously, the IRT routes were given numbered designations with the introduction of "R-type" rolling stock, which contained rollsigns with numbered designations for each service. The route to 242nd Street became known as the 1. In 1959, all 1 trains became local.

On December 28, 1950, the New York City Board of Transportation issued a report concerning the construction of bomb shelters in the subway system. Five deep stations in Washington Heights, including the 168th Street station, were considered to be ideal for being used as bomb-proof shelters. The program was expected to cost $104 million (equivalent to $ million in ). These shelters were expected to provide limited protection against conventional bombs, while providing protection against shock waves and air blast, as well as from the heat and radiation from an atomic bomb. To become suitable as shelters, the stations would require water-supply facilities, first-aid rooms, and additional bathrooms. However, the program, which required federal funding, was never completed. In Fiscal Year 1958, two elevators at the station were replaced with automatic ones. In Fiscal Year 1961, the installation of fluorescent lighting at the station was completed.

In April 1988, the New York City Transit Authority (NYCTA) unveiled plans to speed up service on the Broadway–Seventh Avenue Line through the implementation of a skip-stop service: the 9 train. When skip-stop service started in 1989, it was only implemented north of 137th Street–City College on weekdays, and 168th Street was served by both the 1 and the 9. Skip-stop service ended on May 27, 2005, as a result of a decrease in the number of riders who benefited.

Between July 5 and September 8, 1997, trains did not stop at the station while the elevators were modernized. The project cost $4 million (equivalent to $ million in ). A shuttle bus service was provided to 181st Street on the Broadway–Seventh Avenue Line.

21st century changes 

In July 2003, to reduce costs, the Metropolitan Transportation Authority (MTA) announced that as part of its 2004 budget it would eliminate 22 elevator operator positions at this station and four others in Washington Heights, leaving one full-time operator per station. The agency had intended removing all the attendants at these stops, but kept one in each station after many riders protested. The change took effect on January 20, 2004 and saved $1.2 million a year. In November 2007, the MTA proposed savings cuts to help reduce the agency's deficit. As part of the plan, all elevator operators at 168th Street, along with those in four other stations in Washington Heights, would have been cut. MTA employees had joined riders in worrying about an increase in crime as a result of the cuts after an elevator operator at 181st Street on the Broadway–Seventh Avenue Line helped save a stabbed passenger. The move was intended to save $1.7 million a year. However, on December 7, 2007, the MTA announced that it would not remove the remaining elevator operators at these stations, due to pushback from elected officials and residents from the area. In October 2018, the MTA once again proposed removing the elevator operators at the five stations, but this was reversed after dissent from the Transport Workers' Union.

The elevator attendants serve as a way to reassure passengers as the elevators are the only entrance to the platforms, and passengers often wait for the elevators with an attendant. The attendants at the five stations are primarily maintenance and cleaning workers who suffered injuries that made it hard for them to continue doing their original jobs.

The station was added to the National Register of Historic Places in 2005. From 2013 to 2016, the station was partially renovated, with the station ceiling and northbound platform tilework replaced with replicas and flooring replaced. From January 5 to December 20, 2019, the station was closed so the elevator cars could be replaced, and elevator shafts, mechanical components, and the stairways could be upgraded.

IND Eighth Avenue Line 
The Eighth Avenue Line station opened on September 10, 1932, as part of the city-operated Independent Subway System (IND)'s initial segment, the Eighth Avenue Line between Chambers Street and 207th Street. Construction of the whole line cost $191.2 million (equivalent to $ million in ). While the IRT Broadway–Seventh Avenue Line already provided service to Washington Heights, the new Eighth Avenue subway via St. Nicholas Avenue provided an alternative route.

The A express train has always served the IND station since its inception in 1932. Local service was initially provided by the AA train from 168th Street to Chambers Street/World Trade Center; at the time, local services were denoted by double letters and express services by single letters. The AA was discontinued in 1933 when the CC was created to run on the local tracks along the Eighth Avenue and Concourse lines. The original BB train started running with the opening of the Sixth Avenue Line on December 15, 1940, ran as a rush-hour only local service starting at 168th Street–Washington Heights. The "B" designation was originally intended to designate express trains originating in Washington Heights and going to Midtown Manhattan on the Sixth Avenue Line. The AA was resurrected when the BB was created, running outside rush hours. The AA was renamed the K in 1985, while the BB was renamed the B. The K train was completely replaced by the C midday service on December 11, 1988, with all local service at 168th Street being provided by the B. On March 1, 1998, the B and the C switched northern terminals, ending B service to this station and bringing C trains to this station at all times except late nights.

The IND station was planned to be renovated starting in 2016 as part of the 2010–2014 MTA Capital Program. An MTA study conducted in 2015 found that 48 percent of components in the station were out of date.

Station layout 

The IRT platforms are very deep, with the only public connection between the platforms and fare control being made via elevator. Close to street level is an upper mezzanine level with an unstaffed fare control area. Four elevators lead down to a lower mezzanine below the IRT platforms.  At the upper mezzanine, a closed passageway exists behind the elevator bank.

The IRT station is one of three stations in the New York City Subway system that can be accessed solely by elevators. However, the IRT station is not ADA-accessible. As part of the 2017 Fast Forward plan to modernize the subway system, 50 more stations will become ADA-accessible during the MTA's 2020–2024 Capital Program, allowing all riders to have an accessible station within two stops in either direction. To meet this goal, one station in the Washington Heights/Inwood area will have to be made accessible on the IRT Broadway–Seventh Avenue Line. The 168th Street station was ultimately selected to be retrofitted as part of the plan.

A slightly sloped corridor within fare control leads between the IRT and IND mezzanines. A full length mezzanine extends above the IND platforms. Elevators from the mezzanine to the street, and to each IND platform, make that portion of the station ADA-accessible.

Exits 
The full-time fare control area is at the center of the mezzanine, and has a turnstile bank, token booth, and one staircase and one elevator going up to the southeast corner of West 168th Street and Saint Nicholas Avenue. The part-time side at the north end of the mezzanine has HEET turnstiles and three staircases, two to the southwest corner of Broadway and 169th Street and one to the northwest corner. An exit-only turnstile in the middle of the mezzanine, near the corridor leading to the IRT platforms, leads to a staircase going up to north end of Mitchell Square Park on the south side of West 168th Street between Broadway and Saint Nicholas Avenue.

The passageway leading to the IRT elevators is just beyond the full-time fare control area. There are two exit stairs past this part-time fare control area, near the southwest corner of Broadway and 168th Street, which face north and south.

The southernmost portion of the mezzanine, which is outside fare control, is closed. It features one passage on the east side of the IND station with two exits to the southeastern corner of 167th Street and St. Nicholas Avenue and a passage on the west side of the IND station with two exits to Mitchel Square Park. The closed mezzanine area is now used for New York City Transit employees only. The western area was closed in the 1980s for safety reasons, while the eastern area was closed in 1992.

IRT Broadway–Seventh Avenue Line platforms 

The 168th Street station on the IRT Broadway–Seventh Avenue Line has two tracks and two side platforms, and is served by the 1 train at all times.  It is one of three in the Fort George Mine Tunnel, along with the 181st Street and 191st Street stations to the north; the tunnel allows the Broadway–Seventh Avenue Line to travel under the high terrain of Washington Heights.

Near the north end of the station, there are four elevators adjacent to the southbound platform, which lead to the fare control level. These elevators are accessed via a concourse several steps above the southbound platform. The lower sections of the concourse walls are clad with white tile, topped by a band of green tile, while the tops of the walls and the ceilings are made of concrete. Two footbridges with staircases connect the platforms. A rear passageway at the lower mezzanine level allows passengers to board and alight on different sides of the elevator cabs.

The northern open bridge and northbound platform features a passageway east of the northbound side to an eastern elevator shaft. This shaft contained the two original elevators to and from the platforms. The eastern elevator tower was partially destroyed when the IND platforms were built; the space has since been repurposed as a ventilation chamber. There is a closed stairway on the extreme northern end of both platforms, which ascends to a relay and signal power room. This stairway is not visible to the public.

Design 
The lowest  of the vault walls are wainscoted with rust-colored brick. The tops of the walls contain tan brick. Tile name tablets are placed above the frieze at regular intervals, with white letters on a dark-green background surrounded by floral designs. These tablets contain the text "168th Street". The center of the vault ceiling has multicolored terracotta medallions at regular intervals; these formerly held lighting fixtures.

At the portals between the original vault and the much lower ceilings of the platform extensions, there is a wide arch over the tracks flanked by narrow arches over each platform. These transitions are clad with tan brick. The arch over the tracks has a volute with a laurel wreath. Between the arches, the lower portions of the walls are clad in gray marble. The walls of the platform extensions have white ceramic tiles with mosaic friezes as well as plaques with the words "168th Street". There are two tile panels with the number "168" in each panel. Columns near the platform edge, clad with white tile, support the jack-arched concrete station roof.

Gallery

IND Eighth Avenue Line platforms 

The 168th Street station is an express station on the IND Eighth Avenue Line that has four tracks and two island platforms. It is served by the A train at all times, and the C train at all times except late nights. Unlike other express stations in the subway system, the express tracks, used by the A train, are in the outer side and the local tracks, used by the C train, are in the inner side. This is to make it easier for C trains to terminate here, and turn around to make the southbound trip to Brooklyn. South of this station, the outer express tracks descend to a lower level below the inner local tracks, creating a two-over-two track layout. North of the station, the inner local tracks continue north underneath Broadway to the 174th Street Yard, while the outer express tracks turn sharply under Fort Washington Avenue before continuing to Inwood–207th Street. During the night, the A train makes local stops, using the northbound local track at this station before crossing over to the express one afterwards and the southbound express track at this station before crossing over to the local one afterwards.

Both outer track walls have a maroon trim line with a black border and small "168" tile captions below them in white numbering on a black border. This station has a full length mezzanine above the platforms and tracks. Black I-beam columns run along the platform, alternating ones having the standard black name plate with white lettering.

Gallery

Nearby points of interest 
Nearby points of interest include NewYork-Presbyterian Hospital/Columbia University Medical Center, Fort Washington Park on the Hudson River waterfront, and remnants of the Audubon Ballroom.

Notes

References

External links 

 
 
 Station Reporter – 168 Street/Broadway Complex
 The Subway Nut – Washington Heights–168th Street Pictures 
 168th Street entrance to Eighth Avenue Line from Google Maps Street View
 169th Street entrance to Eighth Avenue Line from Google Maps Street View
 168th Street entrance to Broadway-Seventh Avenue Line from Google Maps Street View
 IRT overpass from Google Maps Street View
 IRT platforms from Google Maps Street View
 IND platforms from Google Maps Street View

IND Eighth Avenue Line stations
IRT Broadway–Seventh Avenue Line stations
Broadway (Manhattan)
New York City Subway stations in Manhattan
New York City Subway terminals
New York City Subway transfer stations
Railway and subway stations on the National Register of Historic Places in Manhattan
Washington Heights, Manhattan
Railway stations in the United States opened in 1948
Railway stations in the United States opened in 1906
Railway stations in the United States opened in 1932
1948 establishments in New York City
1906 establishments in New York City
1932 establishments in New York City